Guzzi is a surname. Notable people with the surname include:

 Paolo Guzzi, (born 1940), Italian poet and critic
 Paul Guzzi (born 1942), American businessman and former Massachusetts Secretary of the Commonwealth

See also
 Guzzo (disambiguation)
 Moto Guzzi, Italian motorcycle manufacturer